Anna Katarina Bergström-Simonsson (30 December 1853 – 30 January 1937) was a Swedish voice teacher who first taught in Swedish girls' schools and later at the Royal Seminary for Women in Stockholm. From 1903 to 1920, she was engaged by the Royal Conservatory, becoming a member of the Royal Swedish Academy of Music in 1912. In 1914, she was awarded the Litteris et Artibus for her services to Swedish culture.

Biography
Born on 30 December 1853 in Färnebo near Filipstad, Värmland, Anna Katarina Bergström was the daughter of the miner Olof Larsson Bergström and his wife Brita Cajsa née Nilsson. She was one of the family's 11 children. From 1873 to 1876 she studied at the Royal Conservatory in Stockholm, graduating as an organist.

From 1897, she taught voice at the Royal Seminary for Women and from 1903 to 1920, she headed the test department at the Royal Conservatory. Thanks to a grant from the Royal Music Academy, she went on a number of study trips to the surrounding countries and attended the international school singing meeting in 1905 in Copenhagen. Bergström-Simonsson was widely recognized for her teaching methods at the Conservatory and the Seminary, receiving warm appreciation from her students for her enthusiasm.

In collaboration with the voice teacher at the Gothenburg teachers' training college Olof Holmberg, for a number of years she gave courses based on a systematic approach to singing teaching which was applied in Swedish schools by the folk school authorities. In 1914, she was awarded the Litteris et Artibus for her services to Swedish culture. In 1916 she married Jonas Didrik Simonsson, the director of the Gothenburg-Stockholm-Dalarna transport authority. She became a member of Nya Idun, a Swedish women's association, in 1899.

Anna Bergström-Simonsson died in Stockholm on 30 January 1937.

Works

References

1853 births
1937 deaths
People from Filipstad Municipality
Voice teachers
Swedish educators
Swedish women educators
Members of the Royal Swedish Academy of Music
Litteris et Artibus recipients
Members of Nya Idun